= Padalwadi =

- Village
- Country: India
- State: Karnataka
- District: Belgaum

Languages
  - Official: Kannada
- Time zone: UTC+5:30 (IST)

Padalwadi is a village in Belgaum district of Karnataka, India. The census data as of 2011 states that Padalwadi has a total population of 171.
